The 1972 CFL season is considered to be the 19th season in modern-day Canadian football, although it is officially the 15th Canadian Football League season.

CFL news in 1972
The Canadian Football Hall of Fame was officially opened on November 28, 1972, in Hamilton. The Grey Cup game was played on AstroTurf at nearby Ivor Wynne Stadium.

The Western Conference Finals were now played under a single-elimination game. The Eastern Conference continued to play a two-game total-point series affair in their Conference Final round until the following season, when it adopted the West's single-game elimination in the Conference Final round as well.

Regular season standings

Final regular season standings
Note: GP = Games Played, W = Wins, L = Losses, T = Ties, PF = Points For, PA = Points Against, Pts = Points

Bold text means that they have clinched the playoffs.
Winnipeg and Hamilton have first round byes.

Grey Cup playoffs
Note: All dates in 1972

Conference Semi-Finals

Conference Finals 

This game was especially notable for its final play. The game was tied and Saskatchewan attempted a last-second field goal to win, or at least score a single. The kick missed wide, and was recovered by Winnipeg in the end zone. As they were unable to run it out, they punted. The Saskatchewan player who fielded the punt attempted to score a single (winning the game) by punting it through the end zone again, but was unsuccessful, and the punt was fielded by Winnipeg, who punted it out again. The Saskatchewan returner was tackled, ending the play and presumably the game, but a Winnipeg penalty negated the play and gave Saskatchewan another chance. The second Saskatchewan field goal attempt, with no time on the clock, was successful.

Playoff bracket

Grey Cup Championship

CFL Leaders
 CFL Passing Leaders
 CFL Rushing Leaders
 CFL Receiving Leaders

1972 CFL All-Stars

Offence
QB – Don Jonas, Winnipeg Blue Bombers
RB – George Reed, Saskatchewan Roughriders
RB – Mack Herron, Winnipeg Blue Bombers
RB – Dave Buchanan, Hamilton Tiger-Cats
TE – Peter Dalla Riva, Montreal Alouettes
TE – Tony Gabriel, Hamilton Tiger-Cats
WR – Garney Henley, Hamilton Tiger-Cats
WR – Jim Young, BC Lions
C – Bob Swift, Winnipeg Blue Bombers
OG – Bob Lueck, Winnipeg Blue Bombers
OG – Jack Abendschan, Saskatchewan Roughriders
OT – Bill Frank, Winnipeg Blue Bombers
OT – Ed George, Montreal Alouettes

Defence
DT – Jim Stillwagon, Toronto Argonauts
DT – John Helton, Calgary Stampeders
DE – Bill Baker, Saskatchewan Roughriders
DE – Wayne Smith, Ottawa Rough Riders
LB – Dave Gasser, Edmonton Eskimos
LB – Ray Nettles, BC Lions
LB – Jerry Campbell, Ottawa Rough Riders
DB – Al Brenner, Hamilton Tiger-Cats
DB – Johnny Williams, Hamilton Tiger-Cats
DB – Grady Cavness, Winnipeg Blue Bombers
DB – Dick Adams, Ottawa Rough Riders
DB – Marv Luster, Toronto Argonauts

1972 Eastern All-Stars

Offence
QB – Chuck Ealey, Hamilton Tiger-Cats
RB – Ike Brown, Montreal Alouettes
RB – Moses Denson, Montreal Alouettes
RB – Dave Buchanan, Hamilton Tiger-Cats
TE – Peter Dalla Riva, Montreal Alouettes
TE – Tony Gabriel, Hamilton Tiger-Cats
WR – Garney Henley, Hamilton Tiger-Cats
WR – Eric Allen, Toronto Argonauts
C – Paul Desjardins, Toronto Argonauts
OG – Ed Chalupka, Hamilton Tiger-Cats
OG – Jon Hohman, Hamilton Tiger-Cats
OT – Bill Danychuk, Hamilton Tiger-Cats
OT – Ed George, Montreal Alouettes

Defence
DT – Jim Stillwagon, Toronto Argonauts
DT – Rudy Sims, Ottawa Rough Riders
DE – George Wells, Hamilton Tiger-Cats
DE – Jim Corrigall, Toronto Argonauts
DE – Wayne Smith, Ottawa Rough Riders
LB – Mike Widger, Montreal Alouettes
LB – Gene Mack, Toronto Argonauts
LB – Jerry Campbell, Ottawa Rough Riders
DB – Al Brenner, Hamilton Tiger-Cats
DB – Johnny Williams, Hamilton Tiger-Cats
DB – Rod Woodward, Ottawa Rough Riders
DB – Dick Adams, Ottawa Rough Riders
DB – Marv Luster, Toronto Argonauts

1972 Western All-Stars

Offence
QB – Don Jonas, Winnipeg Blue Bombers
RB – George Reed, Saskatchewan Roughriders
RB – Mack Herron, Winnipeg Blue Bombers
RB – Tom Campana, Saskatchewan Roughriders
TE – Tyrone Walls, Edmonton Eskimos
WR – Gerry Shaw, Calgary Stampeders
WR – Jim Thorpe, Winnipeg Blue Bombers
WR – Jim Young, BC Lions
C – Bob Swift, Winnipeg Blue Bombers
OG – Bob Lueck, Winnipeg Blue Bombers
OG – Jack Abendschan, Saskatchewan Roughriders
OG – Larry Watkins, Edmonton Eskimos
OT – Bill Frank, Winnipeg Blue Bombers
OT – Charlie Turner, Edmonton Eskimos

Defence
DT – Joe Critchlow, Winnipeg Blue Bombers
DT – John Helton, Calgary Stampeders
DT – John LaGrone, Edmonton Eskimos
DE – Bill Baker, Saskatchewan Roughriders
DE – Jim Heighton, Winnipeg Blue Bombers
LB – Dave Gasser, Edmonton Eskimos
LB – Ray Nettles, BC Lions
LB – Mickey Doyle, Winnipeg Blue Bombers
DB – Frank Andruski, Calgary Stampeders
DB – Bruce Bennett, Saskatchewan Roughriders
DB – Grady Cavness, Winnipeg Blue Bombers
DB – Dick Dupuis, Edmonton Eskimos
DB – Gene Lakusiak, Winnipeg Blue Bombers
DB – Larry Robinson, Calgary Stampeders

1972 CFL Awards
CFL's Most Outstanding Player Award – Garney Henley (WR), Hamilton Tiger-Cats
CFL's Most Outstanding Canadian Award – Jim Young (WR), BC Lions
CFL's Most Outstanding Lineman Award – John Helton (DT), Calgary Stampeders
CFL's Most Outstanding Rookie Award – Chuck Ealey (QB), Hamilton Tiger-Cats
CFL's Coach of the Year – Jack Gotta, Ottawa Rough Riders
 Jeff Russel Memorial Trophy (Eastern MVP) – Garney Henley (WR), Hamilton Tiger-Cats
 Jeff Nicklin Memorial Trophy (Western MVP) - Mack Herron (RB), Winnipeg Blue Bombers
 Gruen Trophy (Eastern Rookie of the Year) - Bob Richardson (OL), Hamilton Tiger-Cats
 Dr. Beattie Martin Trophy (Western Rookie of the Year) - Walt McKee (K/P), Winnipeg Blue Bombers
 DeMarco–Becket Memorial Trophy (Western Outstanding Lineman) - John Helton (DT), Calgary Stampeders

References 

CFL
Canadian Football League seasons